Daniel Miller may refer to:

Daniel Miller (anthropologist) (born 1954), anthropologist at University College London
Daniel Miller (basketball) (born 1991), American professional basketball player
Daniel Miller (cricketer) (born 1983), cricketer for Surrey County Cricket Club
Daniel Miller (music producer) (born 1951), also known as The Normal, founder of Mute Records
Daniel Miller (engineer) (1825–1868), Scottish civil engineer and inventor
Daniel Miller (politician)  (born 1973), president of the Texas Nationalist Movement
Daniel C. Miller (born 1956), politician in Harrisburg, Pennsylvania
Daniel F. Miller (1814–1895), U.S. Representative from Iowa
Daniel H. Miller (died 1846), U.S. Representative from Pennsylvania
Daniel J. Miller (1924–2006), United States Air Force officer
Daniel Miller, weekend evening news anchor for WISH-TV Indianapolis
Daniel Miller, footballer for Preston Lions FC
Daniel Miller, the fictional character from the television series Every Witch Way

See also
Dan Miller (disambiguation)
Danny Miller (disambiguation)